There are currently three different ferry companies that operate vessels carrying passengers and, on certain routes, vehicles across the Solent, the stretch of sea that separates the Isle of Wight from mainland England. These are Wightlink, Red Funnel and Hovertravel.

History

Early sail crossings

Since the Isle of Wight was separated from mainland Britain, probably about 7000 years ago, vessels have transported people and goods across the Solent. However the earliest record of an Isle of Wight ferry service is from 1420 when the Lord of the Manor in Ashey was responsible for boats crossing between Portsmouth and Ryde. By the 17th century a rota of Ryde fishermen were required, on penalty of a fine, to make daily return crossings to Portsmouth.

In 1796 a purpose-built sailing boat called The Packet began a regular service between Portsmouth and Ryde, and by 1811 two daily return trips were made between the Bugle Inn in Ryde and the Quebec Tavern in Portsmouth. At that time the boats, known as Ryde Wherries, had to anchor a considerable distance away from the shore at Ryde, and passengers were transported by horse, cart or on men's backs across the wide and shallow sands to the town. This problem was resolved in 1814 when Ryde Pier was completed.

The introduction of steam power

In 1817 the first steamship ferry, Britannia, began to operate on the Portsmouth–Ryde route, but she was found to be unsuitable for her role and quickly withdrawn. The first successful steam-powered regular service on the route began on 5 April 1825 with the paddle steamer PS Union. Meanwhile, in 1820 the paddle steamer PS Prince of Coburg had begun a service between Cowes and Southampton.

The success of the paddle steamers prompted a period of company formation. In 1827 the Portsmouth and Ryde Steam Packet Company (P&RSPC) was formed and took over the running of the PS Union. This was followed in 1849 by the Portsea, Portsmouth, Gosport and Isle of Wight Steam Packet Company (PPG&IWSPC) operating on the same route. These amalgamated on 1 January 1852 as the Port of Portsmouth and Ryde United Steam Packet Company (PP&RUSPC). In 1873 the Southsea and Isle of Wight Steam Ferry Company (S&IWSFC) began operating between Clarence Pier, Southsea and Ryde but was quickly taken over by the PP&RUSPC in 1876.

On the Southampton – Cowes route the Isle of Wight Royal Mail Steam Packet Company (IWRMSPC) was formed in 1820 and the Isle of Wight Steam Packet Company (IWSPC) in 1826. These merged in 1861, becoming the Southampton, Isle of Wight & South of England Royal Mail Steam Packet Company (IW&SERMSPC). This company became commonly known as Red Funnel in 1935 and is still operating in 2021.

On the Western Solent, the first steam connection between Lymington and Yarmouth was by the Glasgow in March 1830, operated by Lymington owners and continuing also to Cowes, Southampton, Ryde and Portsmouth on various days.

The era of railway ownership

By 1880 railway lines connected to both the Ryde Pier and the Portsmouth Harbour ferry terminals. It was therefore a natural progression for the railway companies to acquire the ferry routes themselves. To do this the London, Brighton and South Coast Railway (LB&SCR) and the London and South Western Railway (L&SWR) jointly formed the South Western and Brighton Railway Companies Steam Packet Service (SW&BRCSPS). This new company bought out the PP&RUSPC and the era of railway ownership of the Ryde Portsmouth route began.

In 1884 the Isle of Wight Marine Transit Company started a rail freight ferry link between the Hayling Island Branch line at Langstone and the Bembridge branch line at St Helens quay. To provide the link the rail ferry PS Carrier was  moved from Scotland. The project was unsuccessful and despite being acquired in full by the LB&SCR in 1886 ended in 1888. It remains the only rail ferry to have operated a service to the Isle of Wight.

In 1884 the Lymington service was bought by the L&SWR.

In addition to paddle steamers, the SW&BRCSPS used tow boats and a tug to carry livestock and subsequently motor cars from Broad Street, Portsmouth to the slipway at George Street, Ryde.

During the First World War four of the SW&BRCSPS paddle steamers were commandeered by the Royal Navy as minesweepers, leaving only two behind. The PS Duchess of Richmond was lost to a mine in the Mediterranean Sea.

On 1 January 1923 the SW&BRCSPS was taken over by Southern Railway which had been created in the Grouping ordered by the Railways Act 1921.

Present Day 
Three commercial ferry operators currently provide services across the Solent. These are Hovertravel, Red Funnel and Wightlink. A list of routes is described below.

Vessels

References

Bibliography

(covers period up to the 1860s)

Ferry transport on the Isle of Wight
Transport in Portsmouth
Transport in Hampshire